Pi Capricorni, Latinized from π Capricorni, is a triple star system in the southern constellation of Capricornus. It has the traditional star name Okul or Oculus (meaning eye in Latin). This system appears blue-white in hue and is visible to the naked eye as a 5th magnitude star. It is located approximately 660 light years distant from the Sun based on parallax, but is drifting closer with a radial velocity of −13 km/s.

The primary member, component A, is a spectroscopic binary whose two components are separated by 0.1 arcseconds. The brighter of the two, component Aa, is a blue-white B-type bright giant or main sequence star with an apparent magnitude of +5.08. It is around 43 million years old with six times the mass of the Sun.

References

External links

B-type bright giants
Spectroscopic binaries
Triple star systems
Okul
Capricorni, Pi
Capricornus (constellation)
Durchmusterung objects
Capricorni, 10
194636
100881
7814